Pedro Romo may refer to:
 Pedro Romo (actor) (born 1957), Mexican actor and comedian
 Pedro Romo (footballer) (born 1989), Ecuadorian footballer